Josephine Jewell Dodge (February 11, 1855 – March 6, 1928) was an American educator, an early leader of the day nursery movement, and an anti-suffrage activist.

Early life and education
Josephine Marshall Jewell was born in Hartford, Connecticut in 1855. Her father, Marshall Jewell, was Governor of Connecticut and United States Postmaster General, among other government posts. Josephine Jewell left Vassar College without a degree in 1873 to accompany her father to St. Petersburg, Russia, when he was serving as a diplomat there.

Career
Josephine Jewell Dodge sponored the Virginia Day Nursery in New York City, a facility intended to provide child care to working mothers on the Lower East Side. Her program developed in 1888 to become the Jewell Day Nursery, which had a greater educational component. Dodge demonstrated her methods at the Columbian Exposition in 1893, and in 1895, she was founder and first president of the Association of Day Nurseries of New York City in 1895, and part of the National Federation of Day Nurseries in 1898.

Dodge's anti-suffrage activities occupied her later career. In 1911, she helped found and became president of the National Association Opposed to Woman Suffrage, a post she held for six years; she also edited the organization's publication, "Woman's Protest." She was the target of a verbal attack at a 1915 "riot" between suffrage and anti-suffrage activists in Washington DC. The same year, she spoke against suffrage in New Jersey: "The life of the average woman is not so ordered as to give her first hand knowledge of those things which are the essentials of sound government.... She is worthily employed in other departments of life, and the vote will not help her fulfill her obligations therein." She countered accusations that anti-suffrage activists were supported by "liquor interests" in the hope of preventing Prohibition. Although many historians assume that anti-suffragists had a conservative social agenda, their motivation was actually different. Mrs. Dodge and others saw a danger in adding to the number of politically uninformed voters, which was already seen as a problem. She also believed that if women became involved in the disreputable world of partisan politics, they would lose some of their moral authority. 

A variety of rose was named for Dodge and was grown especially to decorate tables at an anti-suffrage meeting in New York's Hotel Astor.

Personal life
Josephine Jewell married Arthur Murray Dodge, son of noted copper merchant [Phelps-Dodge Co], Congressman and philanthropist William E. Dodge, in 1875. They had six sons and two daughters together; the girls died as infants, son Pliny died age 5 in 1889, and his brothers were Marshall, Murray, A. Douglas, Geoffrey and Percival. Josephine was widowed when Arthur died in 1894. She died in Cannes, France, in 1928, and was buried in Simsbury, Connecticut next to Arthur in the Dodge plot near their Weatogue summer home.

A trove of Dodge's letters written in the year that Minister Jewell and the family spent in St. Petersburg, Russia are archived in the Special Collections library at Vassar College. However the collection contains very little information about her anti-suffrage activities. 

Her nieces by marriage included philanthropist Grace Hoadley Dodge and pro-suffrage social hostess Mary Melissa Hoadley Dodge, both daughters of William E. Dodge, Jr.

She is descended by Josephine Dodge of Princeton, New Jersey, who shares her belief that women should not vote.

References

External links
Photograph of children at the Jewell Day Nursery in New York City, 1999, in the New York Public Library Digital Collections.

1855 births
1928 deaths
Anti-suffragists
Educators from Hartford, Connecticut
American women educators
Vassar College alumni
Dodge family